The Basketball Tournament 2022 was the ninth edition of The Basketball Tournament (TBT), a 5-on-5, single elimination basketball tournament with a $1 million winner-take-all prize. The tournament, involving 64 teams, began on July 16 and ended on August 2 with the championship game in Dayton, Ohio. The tournament format was similar to that of the last pre-COVID-19 edition in 2019—64 teams, each playing in one of eight regionals.

For the first time, the event had a "championship week", starting with the regional winners advancing to quarterfinals at one of two sites, Dayton and Wichita, Kansas. The quarterfinal winners then traveled to (or remained in) Dayton for the semifinals and championship game. Blue Collar U, a team primarily rostered with alumni of the Buffalo Bulls men's basketball program, won the tournament.

Format
For its 2022 edition, TBT retained its traditional 64-team format, and returned to an eight-region format, with each regional involving eight teams at a single host site (similar in format to the NCAA Division II men's and women's tournaments). Seven of the eight regional sites, plus the championship week venues, were revealed by TBT organizers on December 8, 2021. The eighth regional site was revealed on May 19, 2022, as Rucker Park, an iconic outdoor venue in the New York City neighborhood of Harlem. It became TBT's first-ever outdoor venue.

In a feature it calls "Run It Back", TBT organizers invited all teams that won first-round games in the 2021 edition to play in 2022. All but one of these teams accepted their bids before the organizers' initial deadline (the other one missed the deadline, but later accepted). These 31 teams, plus The Enchantment, a team consisting mostly of New Mexico alumni, were announced as the first 32 teams on January 26, 2022. The Enchantment was accepted based on New Mexico's home arena of The Pit being a regional site. The remaining teams, and the regional placements for all entrants, were revealed in a selection special hosted by Chris Vosters with analysts Seth Greenberg and April Gray that aired on TBT's YouTube channel on June 22, 2022.

As with previous years, all tournament games operate with the "Elam Ending", a format of ending the game without use of a game clock. Under the Elam Ending, the clock is turned off at the first dead-ball whistle with 4 minutes or less to play in the game. At that time, a target score, equal to the score of the leading team (or tied teams) plus eight, is set, and the first team to reach this target score is declared the winner of the game. Thus, all games end on a made basket (field goal or free throw) and there is no overtime.

Venues
The Basketball Tournament 2022 featured games in eight locations, each of which hosted a regional. Two served as quarterfinal sites, with one of those also hosting the championship weekend (two semifinal contests and the championship game). Official regional names, if different from the location names, are indicated in the listings below the location names.

Teams
Source:

TBT has a history of teams rostered primarily with alumni from specific NCAA Division I college basketball programs; 27 such teams entered the 2022 tournament. Five other teams were rostered primarily with alumni from groups of NCAA basketball programs sharing a common bond. Two mostly consist of alumni from a specific Division I conference, one is drawn from a group of historic basketball rivals, another is drawn from NCAA Division III alumni, and the last is drawn from historically black colleges and universities.

Note: team names are per the TBT bracket; some names have slight variation on TBT website pages.

Tournament bracket
All eight no. 1 seeds advanced in first-round play; the lowest seed to advance to the second round was no. 7 Bleed Green in the Wichita Regional.

Six no. 1 seeds advanced in second-round play; the lowest seed to advance to the third round was again Bleed Green.

Five no. 1 seeds advanced in third-round play; the lowest seed to advance to the quarterfinals was no 3. Red Scare from the Dayton Regional.

Only a single no. 1 seed, AfterShocks from the Wichita Regional, won a quarterfinal match; the lowest seed to advance to the semifinals was again Red Scare.

In the first semifinal game, AfterShocks were eliminated by Americana for Autism, the no. 2 seed from the Rucker Park Regional.

In the second semifinal game, Red Scare were eliminated by Blue Collar U, the no. 2 seed from the Syracuse Regional.

Blue Collar U then defeated Americana for Autism in the championship game.

Source:

Rucker Park Regional – Greg Marius Court (New York City)

Xavier Regional – Cintas Center (Cincinnati)

New Mexico Regional – The Pit (Albuquerque)

Syracuse Regional – SRC Arena

Wichita Regional – Charles Koch Arena

Omaha Regional – D. J. Sokol Arena

Dayton Regional – UD Arena

West Virginia Regional – Charleston Coliseum & Convention Center

Championship Week – Dayton & Wichita 
All games played at Dayton, except for one quarterfinal (Wichita winner vs. Omaha winner) played at Wichita.

Announcers for both semifinal matches and the championship game were Bob Rathbun, Fran Fraschilla, and Angel Gray.

Semifinals

Championship

The final points of the tournament, securing the championship for Blue Collar U, came on a dunk by Montell McRae.

Awards

Source:

33-Point Contest
The "33-Point Contest", first held in 2021, returned. In the 2022 edition, select individual players competed in each region to see who could make 11 three-point field goals the fastest, with regional winners advancing to a final round in Dayton.

Finalists (team, region):

 Sean Armand (Friday Beers, Syracuse)
 Jordon Crawford (The Money Team, Dayton)
 Eric Demers (We are D3, Wichita)
 Trevor John (Sweet Home Alabama, Xavier)

 James Long (Best Virginia, West Virginia)
 Anthony Mathis (The Enchantment, New Mexico)
 Ryan Taylor (Ohio 1804, Dayton)
 Brandon Wood (The Cru, Omaha)

The contest and prize of $33,333.33 was won by Ryan Taylor.

Notes

References

External links
 
 Blue Collar U vs. Autism Army - Game Highlights via YouTube

The Basketball Tournament
2022–23 in American basketball
July 2022 sports events in the United States
August 2022 sports events in the United States
Basketball competitions in Cincinnati
Basketball competitions in Dayton, Ohio
Basketball competitions in New Mexico
Basketball competitions in New York City
Harlem
Basketball competitions in Kansas
Basketball competitions in Nebraska
Basketball competitions in West Virginia
Sports in Albuquerque, New Mexico
Sports in Charleston, West Virginia
Sports competitions in Omaha, Nebraska
Sports competitions in Wichita, Kansas
2022 in sports in Kansas
2022 in sports in Nebraska
2022 in sports in New Mexico
2022 in sports in New York (state)
2022 in sports in New York City
2022 in sports in Ohio
2022 in sports in West Virginia
Sports competitions in Syracuse, New York
Events in Albuquerque, New Mexico